Whiteness (white headland) is a village in Tingwall parish, Shetland Islands, Scotland, on Mainland. It is also an ancient civil parish that was merged with Tingwall in 1891.

The village lies seven miles north north west of Lerwick. The parish is now merged with Tingwall. The village has a Methodist church located in South Whiteness and Whiteness Primary School faces Whitedale F.C.'s Football Pitch, Strom. The Whiteness hall is directly next to the primary school.

References

This article incorporates text from -
Wilson, Rev. John The Gazetteer of Scotland (Edinburgh, 1882) Published by W. & A.K. Johnstone

External links

Roll of Honour - Whiteness and Weisdale War Memorial

Villages in Mainland, Shetland
Parishes of Shetland